A list of bus routes and bus fleet (current and retired) associated with Memphis Area Transit Authority. The routes cover Shelby County, Tennessee.

Current routes (as of 5/8/2022)

Former routes 

Groove Shuttle ran its last service on 31 December 2020. Six terminations in November 2021.

Fleet

Active

Retired

See also

 MATA Trolley

References

External links
MATA Bus Routes and Schedules
MATAplus service

Bus routes
Tennessee transportation-related lists
Memphis